Robert of Torigni (also known as Roburtus de Monte) (c. 1110–1186) was a Norman monk, prior, abbot and twelfth-century chronicler.

Religious life
Robert was born at Torigni-sur-Vire, Normandy c. 1110 most probably to an aristocratic family but his family name was abandoned when he entered Bec Abbey in 1128.  In 1149 Robert of Torigni became the prior of Bec replacing Roger de Bailleul who had by that time become abbot. In 1154 Robert became the abbot of Mont Saint-Michel in Normandy. In November 1158 Robert hosted the kings Louis VII of France and Henry II of England at Mont Saint-Michel. Three years later Robert de Torigni, along with Achard of St. Victor, Bishop of Avranches, stood as sponsors (godfathers) to Eleanor, born to Henry II of England and Queen Eleanor at Domfront in 1161. In 1163 he was in Rome. He was also known to have visited England representing Mont Saint-Michel. In June 1186 Robert died and was buried in the nave of the chapel at Mont Saint-Michel under a simple grave marker. In 1876 a lead disc was found in his coffin bearing his epitaph. The translation reads: "Here lies Robert Torigni, abbot of this place, who ruled the monastery 32 years, and lived 80 years".

Character
Robert developed a reputation as being a pious monk, an accomplished diplomat, a skilled organiser and a great lover and collector of books. Under Robert de Torigni Mont Saint-Michel became a great centre of learning, with sixty monks producing copious manuscripts and a library collection so vast it was called the Cité des Livres ('City of Books'). Robert himself was called "The Great Librarian of the Mont". Robert's principal interest was not so much in man's path to salvation, or in the moral lessons of history; it was in what he called "chronography" (organizing historical events in chronological order). He made no attempts to interpret history but wrote plainly "without a trace of romance in his soul."

The 19th-century English archivist Joseph Stevenson said Torigni was not always correct in his chronology and made errors even in matters in Normandy of which he should have known better, yet he was always honest and truthful and his mistakes did not greatly affect the overall value of his chronicle. Modern writers too have pointed out errors in his work; and where he has given confusing or conflicting accounts. Léopold Delisle wrote that it was through Robert's affection for Henry II that he made almost no mention in his chronicle of the death of Thomas Becket or Henry II's involvement therein.

His works
He is best known as the last of the three contributors to the Gesta Normannorum Ducum ('Deeds of the Norman Dukes'), a chronicle originally written by William of Jumièges, appended to by Orderic Vitalis and lastly Robert de Torigni, who brought the history up to the time of Henry I. Robert relied more on Orderic's work than that of William of Jumièges and added information regarding the reign of William the Conqueror, a history of Bec, and a volume on Henry I. Another source he used was Henry of Huntingdon's Historia Anglorum. Henry, the Archdeacon of Huntingdon, had visited Bec in 1139 and during his stay there provided Robert with much of the information regarding the reign of Henry I which Robert used in his own chronicles. Robert, in turn, introduced Henry to a new work by Geoffrey of Monmouth, the Historia Regum Britanniae, a copy of which first reached Bec about 1138.

John Bale, the sixteenth-century English churchman and historian, in his Index Britanniae Scriptorum, identified Robert as the author of two Arthurian romances, based in part on the author's initialling his work with the letter "R". These were De Ortu Waluuanii and Historia Meriadoci, but this identification remains controversial and is doubted by some authorities.

Notes

References

External links
 Robert de Torigni's "Chronicles" (in Latin)
 Robert de Torigni's "Chronicles" (in English)

1110s births
1186 deaths
Year of birth uncertain
12th-century French historians
12th-century Normans
French chroniclers
12th-century Latin writers